Zgornja Javoršica is a village in the Municipality of Moravče in central Slovenia. The area is part of the traditional region of Upper Carniola. It is now included with the rest of the municipality in the Central Slovenia Statistical Region.

It is the birthplace of the Slovene poet Dane Zajc.

References

External links
 
Zgornja Javoršica on Geopedia

Populated places in the Municipality of Moravče